The Brookland Park Historic District is a national historic district located at Richmond, Virginia. The district encompasses 1,157 contributing buildings located north of downtown Richmond and Barton Heights.

Background
The primarily residential area developed starting in the late-19th century as one of the city's early “streetcar suburbs.” The buildings are in a variety of popular late-19th and early-20th century architectural styles including frame bungalows and American Foursquare. The neighborhood is characterized by frame dwellings with a single-story porch spanning the facade, and either Colonial Revival or Craftsman in style, moderate in scale, with understated materials and stylistic expression.  Notable non-residential buildings include the North Side Branch building, Brookland Inn, former A&P Grocery Store, North Side Junior High School, Barack Obama Elementary School, St. Paul's School building (1923), St. Philip's Episcopal Church, First African Baptist Church (1922), and Garland Avenue Baptist Church.

It was added to the National Register of Historic Places in 2003.

References

Streetcar suburbs
Historic districts on the National Register of Historic Places in Virginia
Colonial Revival architecture in Virginia
Buildings and structures in Richmond, Virginia
National Register of Historic Places in Richmond, Virginia